Callixeinus was an Athenian politician who lived around 400 BC, the time of Socrates.  After the Battle of Arginusae, Callixeinus argued that the generals who failed to rescue Athenian shipwreck victims should be tried together by the Assembly.  Euryptolemus brought a suit (graphe paranomon) against Callixeinus claiming that the proposal was unlawful, but was forced to drop it in the face of public opinion.  At the trial, the remaining generals – two, Aristogenes and Protomachus, had already fled Athens rather than face trial – were found guilty, and sentenced to death.  A later rhetorical work by Aelius Aristides claims that Callixenus also proposed that the generals should not be buried, though this is certainly ahistorical.

As public opinion turned against the motion brought by Callixeinus, a case was brought against him and he fled Athens.  He returned in the general amnesty of 403, and died in Athens of starvation.

References
Notes

Bibliography
 
 

406 BC
Ancient Greek statesmen
5th-century BC Athenians